Perambur taluk is a taluk of the city district of Chennai in the Indian state of Tamil Nadu. It was formed in December 2013 from parts of the erstwhile Fort-Tondiarpet and Perambur-Purasawalkam taluks. It comprises the neighbourhoods of Kodungaiyur, Moolakadai, Madhavaram and Perambur.

References

General
 Taluks of Chennai district

Specific

Taluks of Chennai district